Ewart Henry Runciman (15 July 1907 – 14 December 1981) was an Australian farmer and politician who was a Liberal Party member of the Legislative Assembly of Western Australia from 1962 to 1974, representing the seat of Murray.

Runciman was born in Edinburgh, Scotland, to Agnes Evelyn (née Williamson) and Robert Thomas Ewart Runciman. His family moved to Albany, Western Australia, in 1912, but returned to Scotland in 1915 before going back to Australia in 1919. Runciman attended Scotch College, Perth, and subsequently won a scholarship to the Royal Military College, Duntroon, although he did not pursue a military career. Before entering politics, he was a farmer, spending periods at Wilga (1927 to 1948), Boyup Brook (1948 to 1952), and North Dandalup (from 1952).

Runciman entered parliament at the 1962 Murray by-election, which was caused by the resignation of Sir Ross McLarty (a former premier). He was re-elected three more times (in 1965, 1968 and 1971) before leaving parliament at the 1974 election. Runciman died in Pinjarra in December 1981, aged 74. He had married Flora Hester Mayhew (née Inglis) in 1942, with whom he had two daughters.

References

1907 births
1981 deaths
Australian farmers
Liberal Party of Australia members of the Parliament of Western Australia
Members of the Western Australian Legislative Assembly
People educated at Scotch College, Perth
Politicians from Edinburgh
Scottish emigrants to Australia